Maria Cherkasova (born 1938) is a journalist, ecologist, and director of the Centre for Independent Ecological Programmers (CIEP). She is famous because of coordinating a four-year campaign to stop construction of a hydro-electric dam on the Katun River. After Cherkasova's involvement in the student movement on environmental protection in the 1960s, she began to work for the Red Data Book of the Russian Federation for the Department of Environmental Protection Institute. She researched and preserved rare species until she became the editor of USSR Red Data Book. She co-founded the Socio-Ecological Union, which has become the largest ecological NGO in the former Soviet Union. In 1990, she became director of CIEP, which arranges and drives activities in an extensive range of ecologically-related areas on both domestic and international fronts. Cherkasova recently has shifted her focus on children's rights protection to live in a healthy environment and speaks from both inside and outside Russia.

References 

1938 births
Living people
Russian environmentalists
Russian ecologists
Russian journalists